Savage River State Forest is located in the north and northeastern part of Garrett County, in the U.S. state of Maryland. The state forest has many waterways, including Savage River Reservoir, which was built in 1952 by the U.S. Army. The dam was built as an emergency water supply for Washington, D.C. Savage River State Forest is known for its hunting, fishing, camping, and hiking trails.

Savage River State Forest is mostly located on the eastern side of the Eastern Continental Divide, which means that most of its waterways will eventually lead to the Potomac River and thus the Chesapeake Bay. But some of its waterways flow into the Youghiogheny River.

History
In 1800, there were roughly 1000 settlers who lived in Garrett County. But cheap land, improved transportation and growth along the eastern seaboard led to a settlement boom. The national road was completed in 1818 and the rail road arrived in 1852. The transportation system better connected the resource rich Garrett County to the growth needs of the east. Increased quantities of lumber, coal and wheat were shipped east.

By the early 1900s, narrow gauge railroads were used to facilitate logging on steeper slopes as the demand for wood products continued to increase. The result was that Garrett County was heavily cut-over, essentially clear cut, within a 20-year period. The train engines frequently caused forest fires in the tops and slash that were left from the clear-cutting. As a result of the fires, a new forest was created. This legacy we can see today as most of our older forests are the same age and are approximately 100 years old.

In part, as a reaction to the rapid cutting of trees and the burning that was taking place, the Garrett Brothers, in 1906 gave 2000 acres to the state with the proviso that an agency would be created to manage the property and to institute scientific forestry- this led to the birth of the Maryland Forest Service. The rapid exploitation of the forests came to an end by the 1930s and logging companies moved west or converted to coal mining. The early efforts of the MD Forest Service were primarily fire suppression.

On January 8, 1929, the state purchased 9,352 acres of cut-over forest land from the N.U. Bond Company. This was the beginning of Savage River State Forest. Since that time there has been a number of acquisitions both big and small. Now Savage River State Forest consists of 54,324 acres.

In the 1930s, the Civilian Conservation Corps assisted the forest service with fire suppression efforts, tree planting, and constructing facilities for recreational activities. The CCC boys helped with the early snow skiing activities on the forest – later to become New Germany State Park. They helped build many trails where hiking, biking, horseback riding, and ORV riding are still taking place.

The forest
The Savage River State Forest covers approximately 54,324 acres of land in Garrett County (40 acres are in Allegany County). Mature mixed oak and northern hardwood forests comprise a large proportion of the Savage River State Forest. In general, sixty-six percent of the area is composed of older, more mature forests, while thirty-four percent are younger and smaller.

Old growth
Old growth forests have generally been defined as forests in existence since pre-settlement times and lacking any significant Euro-American disturbance. The definition can differ according to climatic and eco-regional perspectives and the growth characteristics of specific native forest systems. In Maryland, an old growth forest is defined as a minimum of five acres in size with a preponderance of old trees, of which the oldest trees exceed at least half of the projected maximum attainable age for that species, and that exhibits most of the following characteristics:
 Shade tolerant species are present in all age/size classes.
 There are randomly distributed canopy gaps.
 There is a high degree of structural diversity characterized by multiple growth layers (canopy, understory trees, shrub, herbaceous, ground layers) that reflect a broad spectrum of ages.
 There is an accumulation of dead wood of varying sizes and stages of decomposition, standing and down, accompanied by decadence in live dominant trees.
 Pit-and-mound topography can be observed, if the soil conditions permit it.

It is also important to recognize that old-growth forests are not static and may not be a permanent fixture on the landscape. The forests and trees within and around them change continuously. This would be true even if human influence could be eliminated. All forests, including old-growth, succumb to natural, destructive disturbances and regenerate over time. A functional old-growth ecosystem includes the loss of old trees due to natural disturbances and the death of old trees. An old-growth system is not static, nor is it always dominated by old trees. Natural processes dictate the age composition at any time. The important factor in this process is that the trees have the opportunity to reach old age if natural disturbances do not intercede.

Forest production

"Savage River State Forest has been managed for industrial forest production for decades, and has been a major contributor to the region’s forest products industry. Numerous sawmills and New Page paper mill operations provide outlets for timber from local forests. Savage River State Forest makes up about 19.0% of the productive forests in the Garrett County area. However Potomac-Garrett State Forest is managed in a similar manner as Savage River State Forest and these two state properties comprise almost 25.4% of forest in the county."

Watershed

"The Savage River State Forest is located within six (6) of Maryland’s 8-digit watersheds. Those watersheds are Savage River, Upper North Branch of the Potomac and George’s Creek in the Chesapeake Bay Drainage and Casselman River, Youghiogheny River and Deep Creek Lake in the Ohio River. The majority of Savage River State Forest is located within the Savage River watershed (57.8%) with smaller amounts in George’s Creek (12.7%), Casselman River (17.9%) and Youghiogheny River (10.7%) watersheds. Very small amounts of the State Forest are located in Deep Creek Lake (0.4%) and Upper North Branch of the Potomac (0.6%) watersheds."

Wildlife

"Maryland first began licensing hunters in 1916, with hunting license sales peaking at 180,000 in the early 1970s. Sales have since declined to about 135,000 now and today a smaller fraction (3-4%) of Maryland residents hunt. Maryland hunters are mostly males, who live in urban settings, between the ages of 30-49 years of age. Residents of Baltimore County bought 11.9% of licenses sold statewide. Residents from the five lower shore counties accounted for 9.7% of hunting licenses sold statewide."

"The majority of the Savage River State Forest acreage is open for public hunting, with the exception of safety zones and other similar areas. Hunting opportunities are primarily for white-tailed deer, but other species, depending upon the site, include bear, turkey and upland birds."

"There are more than 40 species of game animals that occur in Garrett County. Hunting has been a time honored tradition that continues to provide recreation, food, and quality of life in Garrett County. The large amounts of public land in the county makes it a popular destination for non-resident hunters and those from more urban areas where there is little hunting opportunity. The most popular species of game animals continue to provide for most hunter recreation days in Garrett County."

White-tailed deer

"During the 2009-10 hunting season, Garrett County had the seventh highest reported deer harvest in the state. This is significant considering that most counties have a much more liberal bag limit and therefore, higher harvest potential. The reported harvest for Garrett County during the 2009-10 hunting season was a total of 4,922 deer."

Black bear

"In October 2004, DNR implemented Maryland’s first bear-hunting season in 51 years. Subsequent hunts have been held each year since. DNR established a harvest quota targeting an approximate 8 to 12% harvest mortality. This was based on the objective of achieving 20 to 25% overall mortality (seasonal + non-seasonal mortality). Harvest quotas have ranged from 30 to 85 bears between 2004 and 2009. The harvest range for the 2010 season has been set at 65 – 90 bears."

In May and June 2005, DNR conducted western Maryland’s most recent black bear population survey. A DNA-based mark-recapture study was conducted across Garrett and Allegany counties. A similar study had been conducted in 2000. The results of the DNA analysis were entered into Program MARK which yielded a population estimate of 362 adult and subadult bears across the study area. The 95% CI ranged between 242 and 482 animals.

Wild turkey

"In Garrett County the turkey season is split with both a spring and a fall season. It is estimated that over 10,000 hunters pursue turkeys during the spring season statewide. Garrett County ranked number one in harvested turkeys in 2010 with 345 birds reported (about 12% of the total statewide harvest)."

Migratory birds
Waterfowl associated with wetlands

"Important waterfowl areas occur throughout Garrett County. Bottomland hardwood floodplains, beaver impoundments, lakes, farm ponds, and wooded wetlands serve as wood duck, mallard, teal and black duck habitat."

American woodcock

"Spring 'singing ground' surveys coordinated by the U.S. Fish and Wildlife Service suggest that American woodcock numbers have been declining by an average of 1.9 percent per year since these surveys were started in 1968. However, population estimates are stable over the most recent 10-year period. Most woodcock biologists suspect that alterations of habitat, losses to development and changes due to maturation of abandoned farmland are the cause of the population decline. Woodcock use areas of State River State Forest as breeding and wintering habitat. Woodcock prefer moist soil areas with dense seedling/sapling cover and rich humus layers because earthworms, their primary food, are most plentiful in these habitats. State Forest lands are important to woodcock as breeding and nesting areas."

Fish

Brook trout

"Brook trout are Maryland’s only native freshwater trout species. Brook trout in Maryland are valuable for aesthetic, recreational, economic, and biological reasons. Because of their habitat and life history requirements, brook trout are typically found in the pristine, aesthetically pleasant areas of Maryland. While there is no commercial fishery for brook trout, recreational angling has been occurring for centuries, and there is increasing local and national recognition of the uniqueness and quality of fishing for native brook trout. Anthropogenic alterations to Maryland’s environment over the last several centuries, including clear cutting of forests, establishment of large agricultural areas, and urbanization have resulted in the extirpation of brook trout from 62% of their historic habitat in Maryland. Of the remaining 151 populations, more than half are found in Garrett County, the westernmost, mountainous, and least developed area of Maryland. The vast majority (82%) of the remaining populations are classified as 'greatly reduced,' meaning that within the sub-watersheds where they occur they occupy only 1% to 10% of the area that was historically inhabited. A major difficulty in managing the brook trout resource is that only 11% of all brook trout streams and stream miles are fully within state lands, the vast majority of habitat is on private land and a mix of private/public lands. Of the immediate threats to brook trout populations in Maryland, urbanization is the most serious. In watersheds where human land use exceeds 18%, brook trout populations cannot survive and if impervious su rface area is greater than 0.5% in a watershed, brook trout will typically be extirpated. There are also long-term threats, of which global warming is the most serious. Current predictions indicate that warming water temperatures over the next 100 years could eliminate brook trout populations statewide except for western Maryland (Garrett County) by the year 2100."

Geography

	
Savage River State Forest is located on the East-central edge of the Allegheny Mountain region of the Appalachian Plateau in the Appalachian Mountains.  To the West is Deep Creek Lake State Park, Swallow Falls State Park, and Garrett State Forest; to the North is New Germany State Park and Casselman River Bridge State Park; to the East is Dan’s Mountain State Park; to the South is Potomac State Forest; and  Big Run State Park is located within the forest’s grounds.  Nearby notable mountains include Backbone Mountain, Big Savage Mountain, Conway Hill, Elder Hill, George Mountain, Lewis Knob, Little Mountain, Little Savage Mountain, Marsh Hill, Meadow Mountain, Negro Mountain, Rich Hill, Roman Nose Mountain, Snaggy Hill, Whites Knob, and Zehner Hill.

Soil
Despite the streams and valleys that run through much of the forest, most of the soils are acidic and naturally low in plant nutrients such as nitrogen, potassium, and phosphorus. The soil is often steep and stony and is ideally suited for woodlands, wildlife habitat, and recreation.  Water drainage is often stunted; locally called “glades” (poorly drained areas) are abundant throughout the forest and surrounding region.  Peat covers most of the ground, reaching up to 9 feet deep at some points.

Biodiversity
The many streams that run through Savage River State Forest serves as habitat for many types of rare and/or endangered species, such as: Johnny darter, striped shiner, mottled sculpin, stonecat, brook trout and hellbender.  The brook trout population in Savage River State Forest is among the healthiest in Maryland and stonecats have only been found in the Casselman River that runs to Pennsylvania.  Non-native species have also been found in the watersheds of the grounds, such as the fathead minnow, brown trout, rainbow trout, smallmouth bass, rock bass, pumpkinseed, and bluegill.

Larger wildlife includes white-tailed deer, black bears, wild turkey, ruffed grouse, and various small furbearing mammals such as canids, opossums, rodents, and skunks.  Additionally, birds that populate the area include wood ducks, bald and golden eagles, mallards, black ducks, woodcocks, and neo-tropical migratory birds.

Recreation

Savage River State Forest has over 54,000 acres for many recreational activities.  There are biking trails, boat launches, cross country skiing, campsites, fishing, flat water canoeing, hiking trails, hunting, picnics, snowmobiling, and white water canoeing.

Trails
There are ten trails at Savage River State Forest totaling 78 miles. It is recommended that trail users should wear blaze orange during hunting season.
 Meadow Mountain Trail: 12 miles –moderate
 Monroe Run Trail: 6.4 miles - moderate
 Negro Mountain Trail: 8 miles - difficult  
 Big Savage Trail: 17 miles - difficult
 Margraff Trails: 7.5  miles - moderate
 Mt. Aetna Tract Trails: 7.6 miles –moderate
 Asa Durst Trails: 4.5 miles - moderate
 Backpacker Loop: 24 miles – moderate
 Poplar Lick Trail: 6 miles – moderate
 New Germany Trails: 10 miles – easy to difficult

Hunting, trapping and fishing
Savage River State Forest is one of the most used public lands for hunting. White-tailed deer is the most common species hunted in the forest and throughout the state. "A recent survey sponsored by the Association of Fish and Wildlife Agencies found that deer hunting in 2006 generated over $113 million in retail sales, with a total multiplier effect of over $190 million contributed to Maryland’s economy. Deer hunting in Maryland supports nearly 2,300 jobs and generates $71 million in salaries, wages, and business owner’s income, $15 million in state and local tax revenue, and $16 million in federal tax revenue."

"Hunting with rifles, handguns, shotguns, bows and muzzleloaders are permitted in all designated areas in accordance with state and federal laws. Possession or use of weapons is prohibited in State Forests outside of regular hunting seasons. Target shooting is prohibited except at the rifle range. All game birds and game mammals with open seasons may be hunted. Tree stands or blinds are limited to those of a temporary nature, which must be removed or dismantled at the end of each day. The hunting season in State Forests conforms to standard hunting seasons adopted by state and federal regulations."

A rifle range, located on New Germany Road, provides opportunity to target practice and for sighting in firearms prior to the hunting season.

Trapping on portions of the Savage River State Forest for furbearers is permitted through the issuance of a trapping permit.

Savage River State Forest offers many fishing areas in the Savage River Reservoir, and the tail waters that follow. The river is stocked 5-6 times per year and is usually stocked with trout. Some of the species of fish you can catch at Savage River include, large and small mouth bass, trout, yellow perch, blue gill, pickerel, musky and many more.

Hiking, biking, horseback riding, nature observation and off road vehicles
Savage River State Forest offers an extensive forest road system for hiking, biking, horseback rising, and observing nature.

Canoeing and kayaking
Savage River offers white water rafting, flat-water boating, and canoeing. No gasoline motors are allowed on the reservoir.

Camping
Savage River State Forest currently has 72 campsites. Designated camping areas include Big Run Road, Savage River Road, Westernport Road (Elk Lick), Blue Lick Road, Poplar Lick Trail, and Whitewater sites. If you do not want to stay at one of the camping sites you are allowed to backcountry backpack, with a pass, throughout the entire forest.

References

External links
 Official DNR Hunting Regulations

Maryland state forests
Protected areas of Garrett County, Maryland
State forests of the Appalachians
1929 establishments in Maryland
Protected areas established in 1929